The Ikara–Flinders Ranges National Park, formerly Flinders Ranges National Park, is situated approximately 400 km north of Adelaide in the northern central part of South Australia's largest mountain range, the Flinders Ranges. The park covers an area of 912 km², northeast of the small town of Hawker. The Heysen Trail and Mawson Trails pass through the park.

The park's most characteristic landmark is Wilpena Pound, a large, sickle-shaped, natural amphitheatre covering nearly 80 km², containing the range's highest peak, St Mary Peak (1,170 metres). On 12 February 2016 the park was renamed to include the Adnyamathanha word, Ikara, "meeting place", referring to the traditional name for Wilpena Pound.

The park centre at Wilpena Pound is accessible by sealed road from Hawker. Other areas in the park can be reached by unsealed roads, which are mostly accessible by two-wheel drive vehicles except in bad weather or after heavy rain. There are many lookouts, scenic vistas, small canyons and unusual rock formations located in the park. These include Wilpena Pound, Wilkawillina Gorge, Hucks Lookout, Brachina Gorge, Bunyeroo Gorge and Arkaroo Rock. The park has some stone ruins from early European settlement and Aboriginal rock art sites. A rock formation called the Great Wall of China is located just outside the park. Camping is permitted at many locations in the park.

The park is managed by the National Parks and Wildlife Service South Australia, which is part of the Department for Environment and Water.

Geology
The Flinders Ranges are largely composed of folded and faulted sediments of the Adelaide Geosyncline. This very thick sequence of sediments were deposited in a large basin during the Neoproterozoic on the passive margin of the ancient continent of Rodinia. During the Cambrian, approximately 540 million years ago, the area underwent the Delamerian orogeny where the geosynclinal sequence was folded and faulted into a large mountain range. Since this time the area has undergone erosion resulting in the relatively low ranges today.

Most of the high ground and ridgetops in the Flinders are sequences of quartzites that outcrop along strike. The high walls of Wilpena Pound are formed by the outcropping beds of the eponymous Pound Quartzite in a synclinal structure. The same formation forms many of the other high parts of the Flinders, including the high plateau of the Gammon Ranges and the Heysen Range. Cuesta forms are also very common in the Flinders.

Flora and fauna
The flora of the Flinders Ranges is composed largely of species adapted to a semi-arid environment such as cypress-pine, mallee, and black oak. Moister areas near Wilpena Pound support grevilleas, Guinea flowers, lilies and ferns. Reeds and sedges grow near permanent water sources such as springs and waterholes.

Since the eradication of dingos and the establishment of permanent waterholes for stock, the numbers of red kangaroos, western grey kangaroos and euros in the Flinders Ranges have increased. The yellow-footed rock-wallaby, which neared extinction after the arrival of Europeans due to hunting and predation by foxes, has now stabilized. Other endemic marsupials include dunnarts, planigales. Echidnas are the sole monotreme species in the park. Insectivorous bats make up significant proportion of mammals in the area. Reptiles include goannas, snakes, dragon lizards, skinks and geckos. The streambank froglet is an endemic amphibian.

Birds
There are a large number of bird species including various parrots, emus, the wedge-tailed eagles and small numbers of waterbirds. The land within the national park has been identified by BirdLife International as an Important Bird Area (IBA) because it contains an apparently sustainable population of the range-restricted short-tailed grasswren.

Heritage listings
There are a number of heritage-listed sites within the national park:

 Eddie Pumpa Outstation
 Hayward Homestead Ruins
 Impact Ejecta Horizon Late Precambrian Shales Geological Site
 Enorama Mail Station and Rubbish Dump
 Oraparinna Diapir
 Wilpena Homestead Complex
 Wilpena Pound (geological landform)
 Stromatolites in the Precambrian Trezona Formation, Enorama Creek
 Wills Homestead Complex Ruins
 Appealinna Mine Ruins and Miners Hut
 Wilkawillina Archaeocyathae Geological Site
 Dingley Dell Homestead Ruins
 Hill's Cottage, Wilpena Pound
 Enorama Diapir
 Oraparinna Station Blacksmith's Shop

See also

Arkaroola, a wildlife sanctuary
Cazneaux Tree, an historic tree near Wilpena Pound
Mawson Plateau
Mount Chambers Gorge
Protected areas of South Australia
Wapma Thura–Southern Flinders Ranges National Park
Vulkathunha-Gammon Ranges National Park

References

External links

Ikara-Flinders Ranges National Park official website
 Flinders Rangers & Outback at SouthAustralia.com
Flinders Ranges National Park page on ProtectedPlanet

National parks of South Australia
Flinders Ranges
Protected areas established in 1945
1945 establishments in Australia
Far North (South Australia)